The Rossini is a type of alcoholic mixed drink made with sweet sparkling wine (Prosecco) and puréed strawberries. The cocktail is the most popular alternative to the classic Bellini.

Origin of the name 
The drink was named after the 19th century Italian composer Gioachino Rossini.

Preparation 
Being a variation of the Bellini cocktail, Rossini is based on the same preparation. Cut two thick slices from one strawberry and reserve. Purée the remaining strawberries and pour into two Champagne flutes. Top up with Prosecco and serve with the strawberry slice on the rim of the glass.

Variations 
 Bellini. Peach juice or purée are used instead of strawberry syrup and purée
 Mimosa. Strawberry component is replaced by orange juice
 Tintoretto. Consists of Champagne and pomegranate juice
 Puccini. Similar to the Mimosa, but contains tangerine or mandarin juice
– Source:

See also 
 List of cocktails

References 

Cocktails with Prosecco
Gioachino Rossini